WYFT (103.9 FM) is a conservative religious formatted broadcast radio station licensed to Luray, Virginia, serving the Shenandoah Valley.  WYFT is owned and operated by Bible Broadcasting Network.

Translators
WYFT operates two broadcast translators to extend its coverage area.

References

External links
 Bible Broadcasting Network Online
 

Bible Broadcasting Network
YFT
Radio stations established in 1979
1979 establishments in Virginia
Page County, Virginia